Vanya Sokolova resp. Vania Sokolova (born 22 June 1971) is a former Bulgarian volleyball player and captain of the Bulgarian national squad. She is assistant coach for the Bulgarian U20 national team.

Career 
In her long career she player in Bulgaria, Romania, Germany, Austria and Italian A1 and A2 league. Among others she won the German championship with Schweriner SC and helped the team of Megius Padova to ascend from A2 to A1 as a leading player.

In 2005/06 she was best scorer of the season and was awarded best player in Italian A2.
With the national team her biggest successes were bronze at the Women's European Volleyball Championship in 2001, and at the World Championship 2002.

Playing middle blocker Sokolova changed to the opposite hitter position in Italy. Though being a variable attacker Sokolova is also strong in defence. As a middle blocker she was not replaced by a libero in the back row in Bulgarian national team.

Sokolova played her last seasons for Apollon LIMASSOL in Cyprus with some other former Bulgarian national players participating on international level in the CEV Challenge Cup. She retired in 2012.

References

External links
http://www.legavolleyfemminile.it/DettaglioAtleta.asp?IdAtleta=SOK-VAN-71

Bulgarian women's volleyball players
1971 births
Living people
Middle blockers
Opposite hitters
Expatriate volleyball players in Romania
Expatriate volleyball players in Germany
Expatriate volleyball players in Austria
Expatriate volleyball players in Italy
Bulgarian expatriate sportspeople in Cyprus
Bulgarian expatriate sportspeople in Romania
Bulgarian expatriate sportspeople in Germany
Bulgarian expatriate sportspeople in Austria
Bulgarian expatriate sportspeople in Italy